Giorgio Morbiato (born 30 July 1948) is a retired Italian cyclist who won a bronze medal in the 4000 m team pursuit at the 1968 Olympics and placed ninth in 1972. He also won a world title in this event in 1968 and 1971 and finished second in 1969. After the 1972 Olympics he turned professional and won road races in Cecina and Delhi before retiring in 1974–75.

References

1948 births
Living people
Italian male cyclists
Cyclists at the 1968 Summer Olympics
Cyclists at the 1972 Summer Olympics
Olympic cyclists of Italy
Olympic bronze medalists for Italy
Olympic medalists in cycling
Sportspeople from Padua
Medalists at the 1968 Summer Olympics
Cyclists from the Province of Padua